HMS Cranham was one of 93 Royal Navy ships of the   of inshore minesweepers.

Their names were all chosen from villages ending in -ham. The minesweeper was named after Cranham in Gloucestershire.

References
Blackman, R.V.B. ed. Jane's Fighting Ships (1953)

 

Ham-class minesweepers
Royal Navy ship names
1953 ships
Ships built on the Isle of Wight